Alexandra Nasta-Tsisiou (born 2 July 1981) is a Cypriot javelin thrower. Nasta-Tsisiou represented Cyprus at the 2008 Summer Olympics in Beijing, where she competed for the women's javelin throw. She performed the best throw of 53.24 metres, on her first attempt, finishing forty-fifth overall in the qualifying rounds.

References

External links

NBC Olympics Profile

Cypriot javelin throwers
Female javelin throwers
Living people
Olympic athletes of Cyprus
Athletes (track and field) at the 2008 Summer Olympics
1981 births
Cypriot female athletes